Celebration is a two CD set album released by the cellist Julian Lloyd Webber in 2001.

Track listing
Rodrigo Concierto como un Divertimento (world premiere recording)
Lalo Cello Concerto -London Philharmonic Orchestra/Jesus Lopez-Cobos
Delius Cello Concerto
Holst Invocation (world premiere recording)
Vaughan Williams Fantasia on Sussex Folk Tunes (world premiere recording)- Philharmonia Orchestra/Vernon Handley
Canteloube - Bailero (Shepherd's Song )
De Falla - Ritual Fire Dance 
Saint-Saëns - Softly Awakes My Heart (from Samson and Delilah 
Bridge - Sherzetto 
Fauré - Élegie 
Villa-Lobos - Bachianas Brasilieras No.5 
J.S. Bach - Arioso 
Popper - Gavotte No.2 
Delius - Serenade from Hassan
Bruch - Kol Nidrei

References

External links 

 Celebration reviews

2001 albums
Julian Lloyd Webber albums